Everybody Loves a Nut is the 23rd album by American country singer Johnny Cash, released by Columbia Records in the United States in 1966 (see 1966 in music). The album consists largely of humorous novelty songs. The album's cover art was created by Jack Davis.

Cash would reprise a number of the tracks on this album in later venues such as TV performances, and live versions of "Dirty Old Egg Sucking Dog" and "Joe Bean" would be featured on his later live album At Folsom Prison. On the sixth episode of his ABC TV series The Johnny Cash Show, he performed a version of the title track with musical guest The Monkees. "Please Don't Play Red River Valley" would also later be performed by Cash on the series as a musical comedy routine with his wife, June Carter Cash. Cash also performed "Dirty Old Egg Sucking Dog" a decade later during an appearance on The Muppet Show.

"The Singing Star's Queen" features lyrics poking fun at Cash's friend and fellow performer Waylon Jennings. "Joe Bean" incorporates the lyrics and melody of "Happy Birthday to You".

Track listing

Personnel
The release does not credit musicians, but the personnel were:
 Johnny Cash - vocals, guitar, harmonica (track 4)
 Luther Perkins - guitar
 Bob Johnson - guitar (track 4), 5-string lute (track 9), 5-string banjo (track 3)
 Marshall Grant - bass
 W.S. Holland - drums
 Del Wood - piano (tracks 1, 5, 9-11)
 Jack Elliott - yodel (track 3)
 Norman Blake - dobro (on track 8)
 The Carter Family - backing vocals

Use in other media
The song "Dirty Old Egg-Sucking Dog" was used in a 2012 commercial for the Volkswagen Jetta.

Charts
Album - Billboard (United States)

Album - UK Charts

'Singles - Billboard (United States)

References

Everybody Loves a Nut
Everybody Loves a Nut
Everybody Loves a Nut
Albums with cover art by Jack Davis (cartoonist)